The 2nd Korea Drama Awards is an awards ceremony for excellence in television in South Korea. It was held in Jinju, South Gyeongsang Province on November 1, 2008 and hosted by Yeon Jung-hoon and Lee Da-hae. The nominees were chosen from 120 Korean dramas that aired from October 1, 2007 to September 30, 2008.

Nominations and winners
(Winners denoted in bold)

References

External links 
  

Korea Drama Awards
Korea Drama Awards
Korea Drama Awards